Good Counsel/Liffey Gaels is a GAA club based in the Drimnagh-Ballyfermot area of Dublin. The club was formed following a merger between Good Counsel of Drimnagh and Liffey Gaels of Ballyfermot.

History
In March 2016, Liffey Gaels announced that they would be merging with Good Counsel for their upcoming Junior B Hurling Campaign. Over the next few years, other teams from both clubs beginning to merge. Liffey Gaels played their last game on the 17th of November 2018 vs St Vincents in the Minor Football League Division 4. Good Counsel played their last game as Good Counsel in a 4–14 to 0-12 Quarter-final defeat against Lucan Sarsfields in the 2019 Dubin U21 Hurling 'C' Championship on the 19th of November 2019.

Honours
2019:
Dublin Junior B Hurling Championship Runners-Up
Dublin Adult Hurling League Div 5 Winners

References